Neil LeVang (January 3, 1932 – January 26, 2015) was an American musician who was best known from television's The Lawrence Welk Show, playing guitar, violin and banjo.

Biography
The younger of two boys, Levang was born in Adams, North Dakota, a farmer's son of Swedish and Norwegian descent. He got his start playing the banjo and soon added guitar and violin. As a young boy, Levang moved with his family between Adams, North Dakota and Bemidji, Minnesota before migrating west. They settled in Riverside, California when Levang was thirteen. At the age of fifteen, he was playing with area bands and establishing himself as a versatile and accomplished stringed instrumentalist. In 1948, Levang appeared with Foy Willing and the Riders of the Purple Sage, as well as Jimmy Wakely and several other country swing bands.

Levang joined the United States Coast Guard in 1951 which took him to Seattle, Washington. There he continued in the music scene playing with "Texas Jim Lewis and his Lonestar Cowboys". He also hosted his own radio show.  In 1959, he was hired as a temporary guitar and banjo player on The Lawrence Welk Show when Buddy Merrill left to serve in the United States Army. Welk was so pleased with his ability that he hired Levang on a permanent basis when Buddy completed his tour of duty in 1961. Levang stayed with the Welk Band until its final show in 1982. That same year, at the Country Music Association Awards he was nominated for best artist on a specialty instrument, the mandolin. He was also an accomplished studio musician, playing on several records for artists such as Glen Campbell, Frank Zappa, Bobby Darin, Bobbi Gentry, David Clayton Thomas, Neal Hefti ("Batman Theme"), Elvis Presley, Dean Martin, Neil Diamond and Noel Boggs.

Levang performed as a studio musician on many television shows including Little House on the Prairie, The Ed Sullivan Show, The Brady Bunch, The Monkees, Highway to Heaven, Green Acres, Petticoat Junction, and a host of Hanna-Barbera cartoons. He was the featured guitarist with Naomi and Wynonna Judd on the 1985 and 1986 Academy of Country Music Association Awards television broadcast. He was the subject of an extensive career profile by historian Rich Kienzle in the December 2009 issue of Vintage Guitar Magazine.

Levang unknowingly created a new genre of music that would eventually be called Surf Rock with his 1961 arrangement of Ghost Riders In the Sky, performed on The Lawrence Welk Show.

Levang died in Canyon Country, California at the age of 83.

Film credits as a musician
Neil also worked on music for several Hollywood motion pictures. His film credits include:
 
 All the President's Men
 The Apple Dumpling Gang
 At Long Last Love
 Barefoot in the Park
 Beyond the Valley of the Dolls
 Bless the Beasts and the Children
 Blue Hawaii
 California Suite
 Charlotte's Web
 Dead Again
 Dick Tracy
 Emperor of the North
 For Pete's Sake
 Friday Foster
 Goin' South
 Good Morning, Vietnam
 Hardcore
 Herbie Goes Bananas
 Herbie Goes to Monte Carlo
 Hooper
 Hot Lead and Cold Feet
 Huckleberry Finn
 Hustle
 I'll Take Sweden
 The Last Hard Men
 The Life and Times of Judge Roy Bean
 Live a Little, Love a Little
 The Man Who Loved Cat Dancing
 Nickelodeon
 Paint Your Wagon
 Pajama Party
 Pennies from Heaven
 Pete's Dragon
 Rosemary's Baby
 Smokey and the Bandit
 Sophie's Choice
 Thank God It's Friday
 Tony Rome
 True Grit
 Twice Upon a Time
 Zorro, The Gay Blade

References

External links

American banjoists
1932 births
2015 deaths
People from Walsh County, North Dakota
Guitarists from North Dakota
American people of Norwegian descent
American male guitarists
American people of Swedish descent
Lawrence Welk
20th-century American guitarists